Under Your Hat is a 1940 British musical comedy spy film directed by Maurice Elvey and starring Jack Hulbert, Cicely Courtneidge and Austin Trevor.

Production
The film was an independent production made at Isleworth Studios. It was based on a popular stage musical starring Hulbert and Courtneidge, a husband-and-wife team who had made a series of successful comedy films during the 1930s. The sets were designed by art director James A. Carter. Musical numbers included "Can't Find That Tiger" sung by The Rhythm Brothers.

Synopsis
The film is set in pre-Second World War England where a leading film star Jack Millett and his wife Kay attempt to recover a secret carburettor stolen by enemy agents. Suspicious that Jack may be embarking on an affair with his glamorous co-star Carole Markoff, Kay follows him to the South of France, where in fact he is due to receive the carburettor from a contact at a night club, as he has actually been recruited as an undercover man for the government.  (There is a literary pun when the secret agent bringing the parcel, assuming Kay knows all about the identification code and is due to meet him, says dramatically "You are She", and Kay replies "Really? I didn't know I looked so Haggard.") Eventually, the parcel is retrieved, Markoff is revealed as a spy, and Jack and Kay fly back to London with the carburettor.

Cast
 Jack Hulbert as Jack Millett 
 Cicely Courtneidge as Kay Millett 
 Austin Trevor as Boris Vladimir  
 Leonora Corbett as Carole Markoff  
 Cecil Parker as Sir Jeffrey Arlington  
 Anthony Hayes as George  
 Charles Oliver as Carl  
 H. F. Maltby as Colonel Sheepshanks  
 Mary Barton as Mrs. Sheepshanks  
 Glynis Johns as Winnie 
 Myrette Morven as Miss Stevens  
 Roddy Hughes as Film Director  
 John Robinson and The Rhythm Brothers as Themselves 
 Don Marino Baretto as Band Leader 
 Paul Sheridan as Minor role
 Eunice Crowther as Minor role
 Charles Eaton as Minor role
 Paul Henreid as Minor role
 Terry-Thomas as Party Guest

Critical reception
TV Guide found the film "redolent of the Thin Man series, with the added fillip of the musical-stage talent, but lacking the charisma of the stars of that series"; while Sky Movies wrote, "although Jack Hulbert and Cicely Courtneidge had passed their mid-Thirties' peaks as box-office attractions when they made this film version of one of their hit stage shows, it does mark something of a return to form for both of them, with a lively if improbable plot involving spies, and the two stars cheerfully indulging their penchant for disguise. Glynis Johns has a small supporting role, and sharp eyes may catch a glimpse of the young Terry-Thomas."

References

Bibliography
 Murphy, Robert. Realism and Tinsel: Cinema and Society in Britain, 1939-1949. Routledge, 1992.

External links

1940 films
1940s English-language films
Films directed by Maurice Elvey
1940s musical comedy films
1940s spy comedy films
British musical comedy films
British spy comedy films
Films set in London
Films set in France
Films shot at Isleworth Studios
Films about filmmaking
British black-and-white films
1940 comedy films
1940s British films